LigoLab Information System is an American software company that provides software and laboratory operating systems for clinical laboratories. LigoLab develops and distributes the software tool TestDirectly, which is used for COVID-19 testing. It is based in Glendale, California.

History
LigoLab was co-founded in 2006 by Suren Avunjian and Edward Kharatian. Prior to founding LigoLab, Avunjian was Director of IT for Health Line Clinical Laboratories, which was eventually acquired by Labcorp.

In late 2019, LigoLab partnered with Washington-based lab Northwest Pathology to develop TestDirectly, a software tool for facilitating DTC COVID-19 testing during the COVID-19 pandemic. TestDirectly was officially released in April 2020. Since its release, TestDirectly has been used for mass testing by organizations such as the Washington State Department of Corrections and Illinois Department of Public Health.

In March 2020, LigoLab also provided LIS (laboratory information system) support for laboratories in several states including California, New York, and Washington that were conducting high-volume COVID-19 tests. In this capacity, LigoLab integrated its LIS & RCM Operating Platform with multiple instruments for COVID-19 testing.

LigoLab formed a partnership with Northwest Pathology and the Florida Department of Health through TestDirectly in June 2020. The partnership was formed to carry out COVID-19 testing on long-term care residents and staff in the state of Florida.

LigoLab's LIS & RCM Operating Platform was used by clinical laboratory Atlas Genomics to detect the first case of the B.1.1.7 variant of SARS-CoV-2 in King County, Washington in February 2021. In March 2021, LigoLab added LIS functionality to its TestDirectly platform.

As of November 2021, the company had 130 clinical laboratories in the United States in its network.

Software
LigoLab provides an LIS & RCM Operating Platform that integrates administrative, technical, and financial operations in a laboratory environment. The platform also enables automation of laboratory processes and combining LIS and RCM workflows. In 2020, the platform was integrated with multiple COVID-19 testing instruments from companies such as Roche, Thermo Fisher Scientific, and QIAGEN. LigoLab's LIS has been used by laboratories such as Reditus Laboratories.

LigoLab's TestDirectly software provides a web-based platform that links patients and governmental organizations with laboratories, doctors, and collection centers for direct-to-consumer COVID-19 testing, including at-home specimen collection.

LigoLab's laboratory operating system also includes modules for molecular diagnostics.

Scientific references

References

External links

Companies based in California
Glendale, California